Fairholm (also spelled Fairholme) is a campground in Clallam County, Washington, United States.  The community is located at the west end of Lake Crescent in the Olympic National Park.  Fairholm also features a general store, cafe, and other park-related buildings.

Fairholm was settled just prior to 1891 by W.V. Wilson and was named by Caroline Jones. A post office, named "Fairholme", was there from 1891 to 1902; George Mitchell was its first postmaster. Boat service on Lake Crescent connected Fairholm to Piedmont on the northeastern shore.

See also
Ferries and steamboats of Lake Crescent, Washington

References

External links
 – Fairholm in the early 20th century

Unincorporated communities in Washington (state)
Unincorporated communities in Clallam County, Washington